In India, civil aviation is regulated by the Directorate General of Civil Aviation (DGCA) which recognizes 34 (as of 2022) Flying Training Organisations (FTO) for flight training and seven (including one in Singapore) Aircraft Type Training Organisations or Approved Training Organisations (ATO) for type rating. In Indian Armed Forces, aircraft are used by the Indian Air Force, the Army Aviation Corps, the Indian Naval Air Arm, and the Indian Coast Guard, who train officers at their military establishments.

Civil aviation

Flying Training Organisations

Aircraft Type Training Organisation

Military aviation

Army Aviation Corps

Army Aviation Corps is the aviation branch of the Indian Army. Their inventory consists of helicopters.

Indian Air Force
Training Command is responsible for training Indian Air Force officers who are trained at Flying Training Establishments (FTE). Officers undergo basic Stage-I training at the Air Force Academy and after trifurcating them into Fighter, Transport, and Helicopter streams, they are send to the respective FTEs for Stage-II (advanced) and Stage-III (specialization) training.

Indian Naval Air Arm
Indian Naval Air Arm is the naval aviation branch of the Indian Navy. Officers undergo a mandatory Naval Orientation Course at the Indian Naval Academy and take a pre-flying training at School for Naval Airmen and are send to either Air Force Academy or Indira Gandhi Rashtriya Uran Akademi for ab-initio flying training. On completion, they are trifurcated into Fighter, Fixed wing, and Rotary wing streams and send to respective training stations for advanced training and specialization.

Indian Coast Guard

See also
 Military academies in India
 List of airlines of India
 List of airports in India
 List of active Indian military aircraft
 List of Indian naval air squadrons

References

External links
 

Aviation schools in India
Civil aviation in India
India aviation-related lists
Flying clubs